The 2019 Sardinian regional election took place on 24 February 2019. The election was for all 59 elected seats of the Regional Council of Sardinia as well as the President of the Region who, along with the second placed presidential candidate, would also become members of the Regional Council.

This was the first Sardinian regional election with the participation of League and M5S. The incumbent President (Francesco Pigliaru, PD) did not run for a second term.

The ballot resulted in the election of Christian Solinas, the centre-right candidate, as President of the Regional Council with 47.8% of the votes. The centre-left candidate, Cagliari Mayor Massimo Zedda, came in second with 33 percent. The Five Star Movement candidate, Francesco Desogus, received 11 percent of the vote.

Electoral law 

The candidate who obtains a plurality of the votes is elected President of Sardinia. If the elected candidate obtains at least 25% of the votes, the majority of the seats on the board are guaranteed on the lists who support him. The law provides for a single round, with a list vote, the possibility of expressing a preference within the chosen list, and voting for the presidential candidate, on a single card. It is possible to vote for a list and for a candidate who is not connected to each other (Article 9). The candidate who has obtained the relative majority is elected president (Article 1, paragraph 4). To the lists connected to the president-elect, a majority prize may be awarded in the following measure: 60% of the seats if the president-elect obtained a percentage of preference above 40%; 55% of the seats if the elected president has obtained a percentage of preferences between 25% and 40%, while no majority prize is awarded if the president is elected with less than 25% (Article 13). The law provides for a 10% threshold for coalitions, and 5% for non-coalitized lists (Article 1, paragraph 7). No barriers are foreseen for the lists within the coalitions that have exceeded 10%.

Campaign 
On 13 February certain groups of dairy farmers within the region announced an ultimatum that if the decrease in prices is not prevented then they would block entrances to the polling stations on election day.

Parties and candidates

Opinion polls

Results

Voter turnout 

</onlyinclude>

References

Elections in Sardinia
2019 elections in Italy
February 2019 events in Italy